Sadovoye is a rural locality (a selo) and the administrative center of Sadovsky Selsoviet of Tambovsky District, Amur Oblast, Russia. The population was 865 as of 2018. There are 12 streets.

Geography 
Sadovoye is located 19 km northwest of Tambovka (the district's administrative centre) by road. Dronovo is the nearest rural locality.

References 

Rural localities in Tambovsky District, Amur Oblast